Ikechukwu "Ike" Azotam (born January 14, 1991) is a Nigerian-American professional basketball player who currently plays for Leyma Básquet Coruña of the Spanish LEB Oro league. He played basketball at the collegiate level with Quinnipiac for four seasons and earned all-conference recognition on three occasions. Azotam attended the John D. O'Bryant School of Mathematics & Science and Marianapolis Preparatory School for high school and was named New England All-Star in his final two seasons. He is mainly a power forward.

Early life 
Ike was born on January 14, 1991, in Boston, Massachusetts, as the youngest of four children of Ada and Bennet Azotam. He has two brothers, Dozie and Uchenna, and a sister, Adaorah. Azotam's parents both moved from Nigeria to the United States at about 20 years old for a better life. Dozie played American football for the Georgetown Hoyas and is a member of the school's African-American Advisory Board (AAAB). Unchenna and Adaorah attended Georgetown as well, leading Ike to consider joining the same school. The family lived on the south end of Roxbury, a neighborhood in Boston, on 1350 Tremont St. Their house was located very close to the Reggie Lewis Track and Athletic Center.

Ike began playing basketball in fifth grade, but began taking it more seriously once he went through a growth spurt heading into ninth grade. Growing up, he often walked from his home to a nearby YMCA facility to practice. Azotam supposedly made his first slam dunk his first at the age of 15, a moment that he would remember for the rest of his life. Despite repeatedly performed the same move, but failed to do so when he called his friends to watch him. However, in the summer, he grew four inches and was eventually able to consistently dunk the ball. Azotam also liked to play with Dozie, who was seven years older and playing college football at around the same time. His mother said, "You would have to ask him to take out the trash, clean the dishes and clean his room, but you never had to ask him to play basketball."

High school career 

Azotam first played high school basketball with John D. O'Bryant School of Mathematics & Science in the neighborhood of Roxbury in Boston. He came in as a freshman with very little experience in organized basketball and O'Bryant head coach Juan Figueroa praised him for his athleticism but considered him very raw, primarily on the defensive end. However, he rapidly improved within the next three years. On March 2, 2007, as a sophomore, Azotam recorded 18 points and 9 rebounds. He had two offensive rebounds in the final two minutes of the game, but North Attleborough High School pulled off the upset win. By the end of his sophomore season, he was averaging 16.5 points and 9.5 rebounds per game. In his junior season, on January 12, 2009, Azotam was one of seven Players of the Week in boys' basketball named by Boston.com after scoring a total of 40 points and 34 rebounds in wins over Boston English and West Roxbury High School. Later that year, on February 21, John O'Bryant was defeated by Madison Park Technical Vocational High School at the Boston City League championship game despite having Azotam put up a double-double of 16 points and 20 rebounds. Following his third season at O'Bryant, after which they finished 18–6, Azotam earned New England All-Star and Massachusetts All-Scholastic recognition. He decided to attend Marianapolis Preparatory School in Thompson, Connecticut, as a senior to help secure an NCAA Division I scholarship in the near future. By the end of his season with Marianapolis Prep, he was averaging 19.3 points, 10.3 rebounds, 5.2 assists, and 2.1 blocks, leading the team to second place at the NEPSAC championship. The Golden Knights finished with a record of 21–9.

College career
Azotam played collegiately for the Quinnipiac Bobcats from 2010 to 2014. He was twice named to the Second-team All–NEC in 2012 and 2013. Azotam was a First-team All–MAAC selection in his senior year in 2014.

Professional career 
In September 2014, Azotam signed his first professional contract with Marín Peixegalego of the LEB Plata, the second-best basketball league in Spain behind the ACB. The team was coming off a 9–15 season, in which they failed to qualify for the playoffs. He made his debut on October 5 against Azpeitia, scoring 22 points and adding 7 rebounds and 2 steals. In his next game, on October 11, Azotam recorded his first double-double, with 19 points and 13 rebounds vs Canarias Basketball Academy. He followed up by notching a season-high 24 points on Xuventude Baloncesto. Azotam had another notable performance on November 30, when he scored 19 points and grabbed 10 rebounds against FC Barcelona Bàsquet B. Azotam led Marín in points, rebounds, field goal percentage and minutes through February 17, 2015, when he was named LEB Plata Player of the Week. By the end of the season, he was averaging 13.9 points and 6.6 rebounds and making over 55% of his shots.

On October 29, 2015, Azotam inked with the Island Storm of the National Basketball League of Canada (NBL). He claimed that he wanted to play with the team because the Storm were historically successful in the NBL Canada. Head coach Joe Salerno said, "Ike is a tough, hard nose, physical player, who has a great mid-range game and isn't scared to mix it up a bit in the paint." Salerno also believed that Azotam would have an even more successful second season in professional basketball.

Azotam returned to Spain in December 2015, after signing with Leyma Básquet Coruña of the LEB Oro.

Personal 
Throughout his childhood, Ike was closest to his eldest brother Dozie. Dozie, ironically, can’t hit a free throw and has no bounce, but he provided great emotional support. Apart from playing basketball with him, the younger Azotam would ride to the airport with his father whenever Dozie, who attended Georgetown University, would return to his family's Boston home. Upon his return, he would go to the local YMCA with Ike. He did this to the extent that it became a tradition. Dozie said, "It just became a habit...Family comes first." Unfortunately, Ike couldn’t learn much from his brother, Dozie, due to his overall lack of basketball knowledge. He instead turned to Steve Ekechuku to fine tune his game. Mr. Ekechuku earned his stripes on the Akron blacktop crossing up anyone who dared challenge him. They called him simply “That Guy.” Steve was happy to pick up the slack left by Dozie and impart much of his wisdom on his young understudy. Steve always told Ike, “if you believe in yourself, you can accomplish anything!” None of Ike's siblings stand above 6 ft 1 in (1.85 m) and his mother is even shorter. However, his uncles and cousins are far taller, ranging from 6 ft 6 in (1.98 m) to 6 ft 8 in (2.03 m). Ike himself has a height of 6 ft 7 in (2.01 m) and stood 6 ft 6 (1.98 m) as a high school senior.

References

External links 
 
 Ike Azotam on Eurobasket.com 
 Ike Azotam on RealGM
 Ike Azotam on Sports Reference

1991 births
Living people
American expatriate basketball people in Spain
American sportspeople of Nigerian descent
Básquet Coruña players
People from Roxbury, Boston
Power forwards (basketball)
Quinnipiac Bobcats men's basketball players
Basketball players from Boston
American men's basketball players